Tawara may refer to:

Places
 Tawara, Ivory Coast, a village in Savanes District, Ivory Coast
 Tawara, Iwate, Esashi District, Iwate, Japan
 A village on Motorina Island, Japan

Other uses
 Sunao Tawara (1873–1952), Japanese pathologist known for the discovery of the atrioventricular node
 Aschoff-Tawara node, another name for the atrioventricular node
 Twara clan, descended from the Japanese Toki clan
 Tawara language, a Bantu language spoken in Mozambique
 Bales of rice straw used to mark the boundaries of a Dohyō (sumo wrestling ring)

See also
 South Tarawa, capital of Kiribati
 Tarawa-class amphibious assault ship, operated by the United States Navy